The Texas Instruments SN76488 "complex sound generator" is a sound chip produced by Texas Instruments. It is basically similar to the Texas Instruments SN76477 but with internal audio amplifier.

See also
 Texas Instruments SN76489

Sound chips
SN76488